Someone Loves You Honey is the twenty-fourth studio album by American country music artist Charley Pride. It was released in November 1978 via RCA Victor Records and contained 11 tracks. The album was co-produced by Jerry Bradley and Pride. Two of Pride's major hits were included on the studio record: "More to Me" and the title track. Both songs became number one hits. The album itself would also reach charting positions following its release.

Background and content
When Charley Pride first became successful, his musical style was built on elements of traditional, hardcore country. Yet, as his career progressed and country music changed, his sound progressed towards country pop. This style was reflected on albums in the latter half of the 1970s decade, including Someone Loves You Honey. The album was recorded at the RCA Victor Studio (located in Nashville, Tennessee) in sessions held between 1975 and 1977. The sessions were co-produced by Jerry Bradley and Pride himself. A total of 11 tracks comprised the album. Its songs included a cover of Conway Twitty's two hits, "Georgia Keeps Pulling on My Ring" and "Play Guitar Play." The album also contained original recordings, such as the title track and "Days of Sand and Shovels."

Release and reception

Someone Loves You Honey was originally released in February 1978 via RCA Records. Its release would make it Pride's twenty fourth studio recording in his career. It was originally distributed as a vinyl LP, containing six songs on Side A and five songs on Side B. In later years it would be released to digital markets, including Apple Music. It spent a total of 32 weeks on the Billboard Top Country Albums. In April 1978, it peaked in the number four position. It would also become his second studio release to reach a peak position on the UK Albums Chart, where it peaked at number 48. It would later receive a rating of four stars from Allmusic.

Two singles were included on Someone Loves You Honey. Its first single was "More to Me," which was originally issued in August 1977 on RCA Victor. Spending 14 weeks charting, the single topped the Billboard Hot Country Songs chart by November 1977. Its second single release was the album's title track in January 1978. By April 1978, the single also peaked at number one on the Billboard country chart. In addition, both singles would also reach number one on the RPM Country Singles chart in Canada.

Track listings

Vinyl version

Digital version

Personnel
All credits are adapted from the liner notes of Someone Loves You Honey.

Musical personnel
 Hayward Bishop – drums
 Harold Bradley – bass guitar
 David Briggs – piano
 Johnny Gimble – fiddle
 Lloyd Green – steel guitar
 The Jordanaires – background vocals
 Mike Leach – bass
 Charlie McCoy – harmonica
 The Nashville Edition – background vocals
 The Nashville String Machine – strings 
 Charley Pride – lead vocals
 Dale Sellers – guitar
 Pete Wade – guitar
 Tommy Williams – fiddle
 Chip Young – guitar
 Reggie Young – guitar

Technical personnel
 David Briggs – arrangement
 Jerry Bradley – producer
 Bill Harris – engineer
 Charley Pride – producer
 Bill Vandevort – engineering
 Bergen White – arrangement

Chart performance

Certifications

Release history

References

1978 albums
Albums produced by Jerry Bradley (music executive)
Albums produced by Charley Pride
Charley Pride albums
RCA Victor albums